Microlepidogaster dimorpha is a species of armored catfish endemic to tributaries of the Rio Uberaba and riacho Grotão, both tributaries of the rio Grande, upper rio Paraná system in Brazil.

References

Otothyrinae
Catfish of South America
Fish of Brazil
Endemic fauna of Brazil
Taxa named by Fernanda de Oliveira Martins
Taxa named by Francisco Langeani-Neto
Fish described in 2011